Xenocatantops is a genus of grasshoppers (Caelifera: Acrididae) in the subfamily Catantopinae and tribe Catantopini. Species can be found in Africa, India, China, Indo-China and Malesia.

Species
The Orthoptera Species File and Catalogue of Life list the following:
Xenocatantops acanthraus Zheng, Li & Wang, 2004
Xenocatantops areolatus Bolívar, 1908
Xenocatantops brachycerus Willemse, 1932
Xenocatantops dirshi Willemse, 1968
Xenocatantops henryi Bolívar, 1917
Xenocatantops humilis Serville, 1838 - type species (as Acridium humile Serville)
Xenocatantops jagabandhui Bhowmik, 1986
Xenocatantops karnyi Kirby, 1910
Xenocatantops liaoningensis Wang, 2007
Xenocatantops longpennis Cao & Yin, 2007
Xenocatantops luteitibia Zheng & Jiang, 2002
Xenocatantops parazernyi Jago, 1982
Xenocatantops sauteri Ramme, 1941
Xenocatantops taiwanensis Cao & Yin, 2007
Xenocatantops zernyi Ramme, 1929

References

External links
 
 

Acrididae genera
Catantopinae